The 2019 Eastleigh Borough Council election took place on 2 May 2019 to elect one third of members of Eastleigh Borough Council. The outcome was a strengthened majority for the incumbent Liberal Democrats who gained two Conservative seats. No election was held in Botley, a two-member ward, this year.

Results
The Liberal Democrats further strengthened their already large majority, with an increased vote share. They gained two Conservative seats, Fair Oak & Horton Heath and Hiltingbury. The Liberal Democrats successfully defended 10 seats up for reelection, whilst Independent Councillor Raymond Dean retained his Bishopstoke seat with an increased majority

The overall vote share also rose for the Liberal Democrats, as well as for UKIP and the Greens, whilst the Conservative vote share fell, alongside that of Labour and Independents.

Ward Results
A * denotes an incumbent councillor seeking reelection.

Bishopstoke

Bursledon & Hound North

Chandler's Ford

Eastleigh Central

Eastleigh North

Eastleigh South

Fair Oak & Horton Heath

Hamble & Netley

Hedge End North

Hedge End South

Hiltingbury

West End North

West End South

References 

Eastleigh
Eastleigh Borough Council elections